Raviv Limonad (born 26 August 1984) is an Israeli professional basketball player who last played for Ironi Nes Ziona of the Israeli Premier League. He is a 191 cm (6' 3") tall combo guard.

High school career
Limonad started playing basketball at Elitzur Natanya and high-school "Ort Yad Leybovich", with whom he won the Israeli high school championship in 2001.

Professional career
In 2003, Limonad started his professional career with Ironi Ramat Gan of the Israeli Super League. In the midst of the 2003–04 season, he moved to the Israeli club Hapoel Jerusalem, winning with them the 2003–04 ULEB Cup (now called EuroCup) championship, after a win over Real Madrid.

In 2009, he won the Israeli Super League championship with Maccabi Tel Aviv.

On July 11, 2019, Limonad signed with Ironi Nes Ziona for the 2019–20 season.

Israeli national team
In 2004, Limonad shined at the 2004 FIBA Europe Under-20 Championship, together with the likes of Yotam Halperin and Lior Eliyahu, as they won the tournament's silver medal, after a final-minute loss finals to Slovenia.

Raviv has also been a member of the senior Israeli national team.

References

External links
Eurobasket Profile
ACB Profile 

1984 births
Living people
Hapoel Jerusalem B.C. players
Ironi Ashkelon players
Ironi Nahariya players
Ironi Nes Ziona B.C. players
Ironi Ramat Gan players
Israeli Basketball Premier League players
Israeli expatriate sportspeople in Spain
Israeli expatriate basketball people in Spain
Israeli men's basketball players
Le Mans Sarthe Basket players
Liga ACB players
Maccabi Tel Aviv B.C. players
Menorca Bàsquet players
Hapoel Tel Aviv B.C. players
Sportspeople from Netanya
Point guards
Shooting guards